Currently, the best source for nationwide LiDAR availability from public sources is the United States Interagency Elevation Inventory (USIEI). The USIEI is a collaborative effort of NOAA and the U.S. Geological Survey, with contributions from the Federal Emergency Management Agency, the Natural Resources Conservation Service, the US Army Corps of Engineers, and the National Park Service. The inventory displays high-accuracy topographic and bathymetric data for the US, and it's intended to be a comprehensive, nationwide listing of known high-accuracy topographic data, including lidar. The inventory is updated semi-annually. Note, however, that getting access to the data is often less than straightforward in the current implementation.

History: In the United States, the United States Geological Survey (USGS) was the lead agency coordinating efforts across multiple agencies towards a National LIDAR Dataset. The first meeting, a National LIDAR Initiative Strategy Meeting, was held at USGS headquarters in Reston, Virginia in February 2007. In May 2008 a second meeting was held, co-sponsored by USGS, NASA, and the AASG. In 2009, several sessions at the annual American Society for Photogrammetry and Remote Sensing meeting were devoted to this initiative.

The USGS website remains a central source for information about the national initiative, and it includes presentation materials from the various meetings about the subject. This site also discusses how the USGS incorporates LIDAR data into the National Elevation Dataset. In addition to USGS and NASA, numerous government agencies have indicated their interest in such a project, including National Geospatial-Intelligence Agency (NGA), the Federal Emergency Management Agency (FEMA), US Army Corps of Engineers, NOAA, and NRCS.

While there is consensus at a federal level supporting the creation of a National LIDAR Dataset, key aspects remain unresolved, including funding, data specifications, and the delineation of agency roles and responsibilities. While these issues are pending, the following states are among those moving forward with their own statewide LIDAR datasets:

 
Regardless of the degree of state coordination, some counties choose to handle (and control) high resolution LiDAR acquisition and distribution on their own. Such counties include:

References

Geographic data and information in the United States
Lidar